James Machon (born 1848) was a cabin boy in the United States Navy and a Medal of Honor recipient for his role in the Union Navy during the American Civil War.

Medal of Honor citation
Rank and organization: Boy, U.S. Navy. 
Born: 1848, England. Accredited to: New York. 
G.O. No.: 45, December 31, 1864.

Citation:

On board the U.S.S. Brooklyn during successful attacks against Fort Morgan, rebel gunboats and the ram Tennessee in Mobile Bay, on 5 August 1864. Stationed in the immediate vicinity of the shell whips which were twice cleared of men by bursting shells, Machon remained steadfast at his post and performed his duties in the powder division throughout the furious action which resulted in the surrender of the prize rebel ram Tennessee and in the damaging and destruction of batteries at Fort Morgan.

See also

 List of Medal of Honor recipients
 List of American Civil War Medal of Honor recipients: M–P

Notes

References

This article includes text in the public domain from the U.S. Government.
 
 

1848 births
Year of death unknown
English emigrants to the United States
American Civil War recipients of the Medal of Honor
English-born Medal of Honor recipients
Union Navy sailors
United States Navy Medal of Honor recipients